Chaumont-devant-Damvillers is a commune in the Meuse department in Grand Est in north-eastern France. It is known as the place where the last soldier to die in the First World War was killed, when American Henry Gunther died charging a German position sixty seconds before the Armistice came into effect.

See also
Communes of the Meuse department

References

Chaumontdevantdamvillers